Jean-Éric Pin is a French mathematician and theoretical computer scientist known for his contributions to the algebraic automata theory and semigroup theory. He is a CNRS research director.

Biography
Pin earned his undergraduate degree from ENS Cachan in 1976 and his doctorate (Doctorat d'état) from the Pierre and Marie Curie University in 1981. Since 1988 he has been a CNRS research director at Paris Diderot University. In the years 1992–2006 he was a professor at École Polytechnique.

Pin is a member of the Academia Europaea (2011) and an EATCS fellow (2014).
In 2018, Pin became the first recipient of the Salomaa Prize in Automata Theory, Formal Languages, and Related Topics.

References

External links
 Personal page

1947 births
Living people
French mathematicians
French computer scientists
Theoretical computer scientists
Members of Academia Europaea
Research directors of the French National Centre for Scientific Research